Athlone was a constituency represented in the Irish House of Commons until 1800. Between 1725 and 1793 Catholics and those married to Catholics could not vote. Following the Act of Union 1800 the borough became the Westminster constituency of Athlone.

History
In the Patriot Parliament of 1689 summoned by James II, Athlone was represented with two members.

Members of Parliament, 1607–1801
1613–1615: Walter Nugent of Portloman and Richard St John (or St George) 
1634–1635: Edward, Lord Brabazon and John Comyn 
1639–1649: Oliver Jones and William Summers 
1661–1666: Ridgeley Hatfield and Arthur St George

1689–1801

Notes

References

Bibliography

 Johnston-Liik, E. M. (2002). History of the Irish Parliament, 1692–1800, Publisher: Ulster Historical Foundation (28 Feb 2002),  
 T. W. Moody, F. X. Martin, F. J. Byrne, A New History of Ireland 1534-1691, Oxford University Press, 1978

Athlone
Constituencies of the Parliament of Ireland (pre-1801)
Historic constituencies in County Westmeath
1607 establishments in Ireland
1800 disestablishments in Ireland
Constituencies established in 1607
Constituencies disestablished in 1800